This is a list of villages in Malappuram district, Kerala, India. Malappuram district is divided into 138 villages, which combine to form 7 Taluks, which again combine to form 2 revenue divisions.

Tirur Revenue Division 

Tirur Revenue Division is one of the two revenue divisions that form the district. It consists of four Taluks namely Ponnani, Tirur, Tirurangadi, and Kondotty. Ponnani Taluk consists of 11 villages (Subdivision of Taluk), Tirur contains 30 villages, Tirurangadi contains 17, and Kondotty Taluk consists of 12 revenue villages.

Kondotty Taluk 

 Cheekode
 Cherukavu
 Chelembra
 Kondotty
 Kuzhimanna
 Melangadi
 Morayur
 Muthuvallur
 Nediyiruppu
 Pallikkal
 Pulikkal
 Vazhakkad
 Vazhayur

Ponnani Taluk 

 Alamcode
 Edappal
 Ezhuvathiruthy
 Kalady
 Maranchery
 Nannamukku
 Perumpadappa
 Ponnani Nagaram
 Thavanur
 Vattamkulam
 Veliyankode

Tirur Taluk 

 Ananthavoor
 Athavanad
 Cheriyamundam
 Edayur
 Irimbiliyam
 Kalpakanchery
 Kattipparuthi
 Kottakkal
 Kurumbathur
 Kuttippuram
 Mangalam
 Marakkara
 Melmuri
 Naduvattom
 Niramaruthur
 Ozhur
 Pariyapuram
 Perumanna
 Ponmala
 Ponmundam
 Purathur
 Tanalur
 Tanur
 Thalakkad
 Tirunavaya
 Tirur
 Thrikkandiyur
 Triprangode
 Valavannur
 Vettom

Tirurangadi Taluk 

 Abdu Rahiman Nagar
 Ariyallur
 Edarikode
 Kannamangalam
 Moonniyur
 Nannambra
 Neduva
 Oorakam
 Othukkungal
 Parappanangadi
 Parappur
 Peruvallur
 Puthupparamb
 Thenhipalam
 Thennala
 Tirurangadi
 Vallikunnu
 Vengara

Perinthalmanna Revenue Division 

Perinthalmanna Revenue Division is the other revenue division which is included in the district. It consists of three Taluks namely Nilambur, Eranad, and Perinthalmanna. Nilambur Taluk consists of 21 villages (Subdivision of Taluk), Eranad contains 23 villages, and Perinthalmanna Taluk consists of 24 revenue villages.

Eranad Taluk 

 Anakkayam
 Areekode
 Chembrassery
 Edavanna
 Elankur
 Karakunnu
 Kavanoor
 Kizhuparamba
 Malappuram
 Manjeri
 Melmuri
 Narukara
 Panakkad
 Pandikkad
 Pandallur
 Payyanad
 Perakamanna
 Pookkottur
 Pulpatta
 Trikkalangode
 Urangattiri
 Vettikattiri
 Vettilappara

Nilambur Taluk 

 Akampadam
 Amarambalam
 Cherucode
 Chokkad
 Chungathara
 Edakkara
 Kalikavu
 Karulai
 Karuvarakundu
 Kerala Estate
 Kurumbalangode
 Mampad
 Moothedam
 Nilambur
 Pullipadam
 Porur
 Pothukal
 Thiruvali
 Tuvvur
 Vazhikkadavu
 Vellayur
 Wandoor

Perinthalmanna Taluk 

 Aliparamba
 Anamangad
 Angadipuram
 Arakkuparamba
 Edappatta
 Elamkulam
 Kariavattom
 Keezhattur
 Kodur
 Koottilangadi
 Kuruva
 Kuruvambalam
 Mankada
 Melattur
 Moorkkanad
 Nenmini
 Pathaikara
 Perinthalmanna
 Pulamantol
 Puzhakkattiri
 Thazhekode
 Vadakkangara
 Valambur
 Valapuram
 Vettathur

See also 
 List of Gram Panchayats in Malappuram district
 List of Desoms in Malappuram district (1981)

References 

Malappuram district
villages in Malappuram